The Spirit River is a river in northern Alberta, Canada. The name is a translation of the Cree words Chepe Sepi, meaning ghost or spirit.

The town of Spirit River is established close to the river banks and is named for the river, as is the Municipal District of Spirit River No. 133 and the Spirit River Formation, a geological formation of the Western Canadian Sedimentary Basin.

Course
It flows eastwards through the Municipal District of Spirit River No. 133, then by Rycroft, south of the Birch Hills into Birch Hills County.

See also 
 List of rivers of Alberta

References

Rivers of Alberta